Another Era is a 2018 drama produced by TVB, iQiyi, CCTV and CRTP. It is the sequel to At the Threshold of an Era with Roger Kwok, Niki Chow, Frankie Lam, Tavia Yeung, Benjamin Yuen and Pakho Chau as the main leads; and Linda Chung as a guest star.

The theme and storyline revolve around the development of Hong Kong's economy in the past 10 years. Production cost a total of HK$100 million and took half a year.

The cut 34-episode version was uploaded on iQiyi on 29 August 2018, and aired on CCTV-8 on 30 August 2018. The original 36 episode version aired on TVB Jade from 10 September 2018 and on Mediacorp's Channel U on 23 April 2020.

Plot
The story of Another Era begins with the global financial crisis of 2008. Ambitious businessman Leo Ho Ting Sang (Roger Kwok) wanted to buy out Fong Chung Yam’s (Bowie Wu) business group, but Cheuk Kai Tong (Pat Poon) stopped him in time. Furious, Leo decides to out a plan to destroy him.

Ten years later, Cheuk Kai Tong becomes one of the richest men in the city, but the psychological torment of his son’s untimely death has put him bedridden, soon followed by a coma. His daughter, Cheuk Ding Yiu (Niki Chow) learns to manage the family business, and together with her trusted accountant Ko Chit (Frankie Lam), she starts a business war with Leo. Leo’s wife Cheung Ming Hei (Tavia Yeung), Fong Chung Yam’s grandson Fong Chak Yu (Benjamin Yuen), and rookie entrepreneur Ching Hoi (Pakho Chau) also join the war, starting a new era of business politics.

Cast

Ho family

Cheuk family

Fong family

Ko family

Man family

Other cast

Broadcast

Music

Viewership ratings

TVB Jade

Awards and nominations

See also
At the Threshold of an Era

References

TVB dramas
Hong Kong television series
2010s Hong Kong television series